Mike Parsons (born 25 August 1950) is a British entrepreneur, best known for founding Barchester Healthcare, the UK's third largest provider of care homes. He retired as CEO in 2013.

Education
Parsons read economics at Sussex and Oxford Universities and became a management consultant. He subsequently took an MBA at London Business School and the Diploma in International Management at Hautes Etudes Commerciales, Paris and the Graduate School of Business Administration on Wall Street.

Early career
Parsons was a founding director, share holder and managing director of a top London advertising agency (KHBB) which he and his partners sold to Saatchi & Saatchi in 1985, thus becoming a major shareholder in that company. He worked at Saatchi for five years and was Chief Operating Officer of the international network. During this time he rationalised the Saatchi International network which involved the merging of many businesses. In 1990 he sold his shareholding and left the company.

References 

Alumni of London Business School
1950 births
Living people
English healthcare chief executives